The United Nations Peace Medal is a commemorative medal produced by the United Nations to promote peace. First made by Franklin Mint in 1971, a new design is produced annually, with limited editions offered for sale in gold, silver, and bronze. Gold medals may be formally presented by UN officials as a diplomatic gift to heads of state, former UN Secretaries-General, and dignitaries visiting the UN Headquarters.

References

Peace Medal
Awards established in 1971
Peace awards